Clavator is a genus of air-breathing land snails, terrestrial pulmonate gastropod mollusks in the gastropod in the family Acavidae.

Species
 Clavator moreleti

References

Acavidae
Taxonomy articles created by Polbot